Ronald (Ron) Tarver  (born 1957) is an American artist and educator. He was the first Black photographer at the Muskogee Phoenix and also worked at the  Springfield News-Leader in Missouri (1980-1983), before joining The Philadelphia Inquirer. His career at the Inquirer in Philadelphia, Pennsylvania, spans more than three decades (1983–2014). Tarver currently serves as Associate Professor of Art specializing in photography at Swarthmore College.

Tarver has documented issues ranging from heroin addiction to Black cowboys to African American veterans. Tarver's photoseries The Badlands: In the Grip of Drugs earned  Third Prize in the Daily Life category of the World Press Photo Awards in 1993.
Other major projects include The Long Ride Home: The Black Cowboy Experience in America, a nationwide project on Black cowboys, and the book We Were There: Voices of African American Veterans (2004), a  collaboration with writer  Yvonne Latty.  In 2012, Tarver earned a Pulitzer Prize for Public Service as part of a team reporting on racialized school violence in the Philadelphia public school system.

Life and work

Tarver was born in Fort Gibson, Oklahoma. The seeds of his lifelong fascination with photography were planted by his father, an avid photographer who documented much of the Black community in Fort Gibson. Tarver studied at Northeastern State University and soon after graduating was hired as the first Black photographer at the Muskogee Phoenix. In 1980, Tarver earned a position at the Springfield News-Leader in Missouri  where he worked until 1983. That year, he was hired as a photographer at The Philadelphia Inquirer. During his 32-year stint at The Philadelphia Inquirer, Tarver's work spanned from extended photo essays on aftermath of the war in Beirut  to conflicts within the Catholic church in Ireland.

In 1992, Tarver photographed the heroin epidemic that ravaged communities in Northeast Philadelphia in a series titled The Badlands: In the Grip of Drugs  which garnered public outcry and response from the Philadelphia police department. The story was later recognized by the World Press Photo Awards in 1993, earning Third Prize in the Daily Life category. At the culmination of the Badlands project, Tarver began documenting a group of urban cowboys in North Philadelphia. This eventually expanded into a nationwide project on Black cowboys called The Long Ride Home: The Black Cowboy Experience in America. It spanned from California to Illinois to Texas with support from a National Geographic Development Grant.

In 2002, Tarver photographed 28 African-American veterans for the book We Were There: Voices of African American Veterans, from World War II to the War in Iraq. Co-authored with Yvonne Latty, the book was published by HarperCollins in 2004  and exhibited at the National Constitution Center. In 2012, Tarver was also part of the Inquirer team assembled to investigate racialized school violence in the Philadelphia public school system. The story later won a Pulitzer Prize for Public Service.

Tarver left the Inquirer in 2014, pursuing an M.F.A at the University of Arts while teaching photography at Swarthmore College. During that time, he started An Overdue Conversation with My Father, a body of work that appropriates and reimagines the photographs taken by his father in Oklahoma in the 1940s and 1950s.

Twenty years later, selected images from The Long Ride Home were exhibited as part of the Black Cowboy exhibition at the Studio Museum in Harlem in 2016, curated by Amanda Hunt. Major publications like The New York Times, Hyperallergic, The New Yorker and Vice have since written about the work.

Tarver's work has been exhibited nationally and internationally in over 30 solo and 50 group exhibitions and is included in many private, corporate, and museum collections, including the Philadelphia Museum of Art, State Museum of Pennsylvania in Harrisburg, and Smithsonian American Art Museum in Washington DC. His work is represented by Robin Rice Gallery in New York, Soho-Myriad in Atlanta, Georgia, and Grand Image in Seattle, Washington. Tarver has lectured at various institutions, including The Barnes Foundation, the Rosenbach Museum, and the Woodmere Art Museum. He has also taught at Drury University, Perkins Center for the Arts, Samuel S. Fleisher Art Memorial, and the Princeton Photography Club.

Publications 
 Co-authored with Yvonne Latty, We Were There: Voices of African American Veterans, from World War II to the War in Iraq, New York: HarperCollins, 2004.

Awards 
       2021 Guggenheim Fellowship from the John Simon Guggenheim Memorial Foundation. for photography
       2007 and 2019 Independence Foundation Fellowship
       2012 Pulitzer Prize for Public Service, as part of the team covering racialized school violence
       2007 Fleisher Wind Challenge
       2001 Pew Fellowship in the Arts
       1994 National Geographic Magazine, Development Grant for Documentary Photography
       1993 Sigma Delta Chi Award of the Society of Professional Journalists
       1993 World Press Photo, Third Prize for Daily Life
       1992 Nation Press Photographers / Association University of Missouri Pictures of the Year awards, Third Place

References 

American photojournalists
Living people
African-American photographers
African-American journalists
Northeastern State University alumni
Swarthmore College faculty
University of the Arts (Philadelphia) alumni
1957 births
Photographers from Oklahoma
Artists from Oklahoma
21st-century African-American people
20th-century African-American people